Karuba is a village in Lääneranna Parish, Pärnu County in southwestern Estonia. Prior to the administrative reform in Estonia in 2017, Karuba was located in Koonga Parish.

References

 

Villages in Pärnu County